Dikoleps cutleriana is a species of sea snail, a marine gastropod mollusk in the family Skeneidae.

Description
The size of the shell varies between 0.4 mm and 1.2 mm.

Distribution
This marine species occurs in European waters in the North Sea and off Northern Spain and Portugal; and in the Mediterranean Sea.

References

 Clark W. (1849) On two new species of testaceous Mollusca. Annals and Magazine of Natural History, (2)4: 424–425
 Rubio F., Dantart L. & Luque A.A., 1998: Two new species of Dikoleps (Gastropoda, Skeneidae) from the Mediterranean coast of Spain, Iberus 16(1): 81–93

External links
 

cutleriana
Gastropods described in 1848